This list indexes notable Native American artists from Oklahoma, Oklahoma Territory, or Indian Territory.  Artists listed in this index were born in, at one time lived in, or presently live in what is now Oklahoma.

Basket weavers
 Lena Blackbird, Cherokee Nation, basket weaver
 Mike Dart (born 1977), Cherokee Nation, basket weaver
 Mavis Doering (1929–2007), Cherokee Nation, basket weaver

Bead artists

 Tahnee Ahtoneharjo-Growingthunder, Kiowa/Muscogee/Seminole
 Richard Aitson (born 1953), Kiowa/Kiowa Apache
 Martha Berry, Cherokee Nation
 Les Berryhill, Yuchi/Creek, bead artist
 Vanessa Jennings, Kiowa/Kiowa Apache/Pima, beadwork artist, regalia maker, and tipi maker
 Lois Smoky Kaulaity (1907–1981), Kiowa beadwork artist and painter (one of the Kiowa Six)

Ceramic artists
 Mel Cornshucker, Keetoowah Band Cherokee, (born 1952)
 Anita Fields, Osage/Muskogee, (born 1950)
 Bill Glass Jr., Cherokee Nation
 Anna Mitchell, Cherokee Nation (1926–2012), revived the art of Cherokee pottery for the Western Cherokee
 Jane Osti, Cherokee Nation
 Jeri Redcorn, Caddo/Potawatomi (born ca. 1940)

Dancers
 Yvonne Chouteau (1929–2016), Shawnee Tribe, ballerina
 Rosella Hightower (1920–2008), Choctaw ballerina
 Moscelyne Larkin (1925–2012), Peoria/Shawnee ballerina
 Maria Tallchief (1925–2013), Osage ballerina
 Marjorie Tallchief (born 1926), Osage ballerina

Diverse cultural artists

 Mildred Cleghorn (1910–1997), Fort Sill Apache Tribe, dollmaker
 Vanessa Jennings, Kiowa/Pima, beadwork, customary clothing and tipis
 Alice Littleman (1910–2000), Kiowa, beadwork and regalia maker 
 Ardina Moore, (born 1930) Osage/Quapaw, dance regalia, beadwork, fashion design, ribbonwork
 Josephine Myers-Wapp, (1912–2014) Comanche, finger weaver, beader, textile artist
 Georgeann Robinson, (1917–1985) Osage, traditional apparel, ribbonwork
 Hastings Shade (1941–2010), Cherokee Nation, marble- and gig-maker
 Tommy Wildcat, Cherokee Nation/Muscogee Creek/Natchez, flute maker
 Sandy Fife Wilson (born 1950) Muscogee Creek, basket maker, fingerweaver, shell carver, textile artist, fashion designer

Draftspeople
 Roy Boney Jr., Cherokee Nation, draftsman, painter, animator
 St. David Pendleton Oakerhater, "Making Medicine" (1847–1931), Southern Cheyenne, ledger artist
 Joseph L. Erb, Cherokee Nation, painter, sculptor, animator

Fashion designers
 Ardina Moore (Quapaw/Osage)
 Lloyd Kiva New (Cherokee Nation), (1916–2002), educator, fashion designer, painter, textile designer
 Wendy Ponca, Osage, (born 1960), fashion designer, textile designer
 Margaret Roach Wheeler, (Chickasaw/Choctaw) (born 1943), weaver

Installation artists
 Edgar Heap of Birds (born 1954), Cheyenne-Arapaho Tribes installation artist, painter, conceptual artist
 Richard Ray Whitman (born 1949), Yuchi/Muscogee Creek Nation, actor, photographer, painter, installation artist
 Holly Wilson (Delaware Nation/Cherokee, born 1968), sculptor, installation artist

Jewelers
 Heidi Bigknife, Shawnee Tribe, jeweler, mixed-media artist, sculptor

Painters

 Mary Adair (born 1936) Cherokee Nation painter
 Spencer Asah (c. 1905–1954), Kiowa, painter (one of the Kiowa Six)
 James Auchiah (1906–1975), painter (one of the Kiowa Six)
 Jean Bales (1946–2003), Iowa painter
 Louis W. Ballard (1931–2007) Honga-no-zhe, Quapaw/Cherokee, painter and composer
 Fred Beaver (1911–1976), Muscogee Creek/Seminole, painter
 Archie Blackowl (1911–1967), Cheyenne, painter
 Acee Blue Eagle (1907–1959), Muscogee Creek, painter
 Roy Boney, Jr., Cherokee Nation, draftsman, painter, animator
 Blackbear Bosin (1921–1980), Kiowa/Comanche, painter, sculptor
 T.C. Cannon (Pai-doung-u-day), Kiowa/Caddo
 Sherman Chaddlesone (1947–2013), Kiowa, painter
 Mirac Creepingbear (1947–1990), Kiowa/Pawnee/Arapaho, painter
 Woody Crumbo (1912–1989), Citizen Potawatomi, painter
 Talmadge Davis (1962–2005), Cherokee Nation painter
 Cecil Dick (1915–1992), Cherokee, painter
 Joseph L. Erb, Cherokee Nation, painter, sculptor, animator
 Gina Gray, (1954–2014) Osage painter, mixed-media designer
 Franklin Gritts (1915–1996), Cherokee, painter
 Enoch Kelly Haney (born 1940), Seminole/Muscogee Creek, painter, sculptor
 Albert Harjo (1937–2019), Muscogee Creek
 Benjamin Harjo, Jr. (born 1945), Seminole/Absentee Shawnee, painter
 Sharron Ahtone Harjo (born 1945), Kiowa, painter, ledger artist
 Edgar Heap of Birds (born 1954), Cheyenne-Arapaho Tribes installation artist, painter, conceptual artist
 Valjean McCarty Hessing (1934–2006) Choctaw, painter
 Joan Hill (1930–2020), Muscogee Creek/Cherokee, painter
 Jack Hokeah (1902–1973), Kiowa, painter (one of the Kiowa Six)
 Allan Houser (1914–1994), Chiricahua Apache, sculptor and painter
 Norma Howard (born 1958), Choctaw Nation/Chickasaw/Mississippi Choctaw, painter
 Sharon Irla (born 1957), Cherokee Nation painter
 Ruthe Blalock Jones (Chu-Lun-Dit) (born 1939), Eastern Shawnee/Peoria
 Merlin Little Thunder, Southern Cheyenne, painter
 Jane McCarty Mauldin (1936–1997) Choctaw, painter
 Barbara McAlister (born 1941), Cherokee Nation painter, opera singer
 America Meredith (born 1972), Cherokee Nation painter, printmaker
 Stephen Mopope (1898–1974), Kiowa, painter (one of the Kiowa Six)
 Jackson Narcomey (1942–2012), Muscogee Creek, painter and printmaker
 Doc Tate Nevaquaya (Comanche Nation, 1932–1996), Flatstyle painter and Native American flautist
 Fernando Padilla, Jr. (born 1958), San Felipe Pueblo/Navajo painter and sculptor
 Harvey Pratt (born 1941), Cheyenne-Arapaho painter, sculptor
 Robert Redbird (1939–2016), Kiowa painter
 Paladine Roye (1946–2001), Ponca painter
 Silver Horn (1860–1940), Kiowa, painter
 Lois Smoky Kaulaity (1907–1981), Kiowa painter (one of the Kiowa Six)
 Ernest Spybuck (1883–1949), Absentee Shawnee painter
 Jimmie Carole Fife Stewart (born 1940) Muscogee Creek "Master Artist" painter and fashion designer
 Virginia Stroud (born 1951), United Keetoowah Band-Muscogee painter
 Carl Sweezy (1881–1953), Arapaho painter
 Dana Tiger (born 1961), Muscogee Creek/Seminole/Cherokee painter
 Jerome Tiger (1941–1967), Muscogee Creek/Seminole painter
 Johnny Tiger, Jr. (1940–2015), Muscogee Creek/Seminole painter and sculptor
 Monroe Tsatoke (1904–1937), Kiowa, painter (one of the Kiowa Six)
 W. Richard “Dick” West, Sr. (1912–1996), Cheyenne painter
 David E. Williams (1933–1985) Kiowa/Tonkawa/Kiowa Apache painter

Photographers
 Jennie Ross Cobb (1881–1959), Cherokee
 Shan Goshorn (1957–2018), Eastern Band Cherokee
 Sharon Irla (born 1957), Cherokee Nation
 Parker McKenzie (1897–1999), Kiowa
 Horace Poolaw (1906–1984), Kiowa
 Richard Ray Whitman (born 1949), Yuchi/Muscogee Creek Nation photographer, painter, installation artist

Printmakers
 T.C. Cannon (Pai-doung-u-day), Kiowa/Caddo
 Benjamin Harjo, Jr. (born 1945), Seminole/Absentee Shawnee, painter
 Ruthe Blalock Jones (Chu-Lun-Dit) (born 1939), Eastern Shawnee/Delaware/Peoria
 America Meredith (born 1972), Cherokee Nation painter, printmaker
 Jackson Narcomey (born 1942), Muscogee Creek, painter, printmaker

Sculptors

 Sara Bates (born 1944), Cherokee Nation, mixed media artist, sculptor
 Blackbear Bosin (1921–1980), Kiowa/Comanche, painter, sculptor
 Joseph L. Erb, Cherokee Nation, painter, sculptor, animator
 Bill Glass Jr., Cherokee Nation
 Enoch Kelly Haney (1940-2022), Seminole/Muscogee, painter, sculptor
 Allan Houser (1914–1994), Chiricahua Apache, sculptor and painter
 Fernando Padilla, Jr.  (born 1958), San Felipe Pueblo/Navajo painter and sculptor
 Harvey Pratt (born 1941), Cheyenne-Arapaho painter, sculptor
 Johnny Tiger, Jr. (born 1940), Muscogee/Seminole painter and sculptor
 Holly Wilson (Delaware Nation/Cherokee, born 1968), sculptor, installation artist

See also

 Native American art
 List of Native American artists
 Timeline of Native American art history
 List of indigenous artists of the Americas
 Native Americans in the United States
 Native American women in the arts
 List of writers from peoples indigenous to the Americas
 Native American basketry
 Native American pottery
 Bacone school
 List of Native American tribes in Oklahoma

External links
American Indian Art, Oklahoma Historical Society
American Indian Cultural Center and Museum, Oklahoma City
Southeastern Indian Artists Association

References

 
Oklahoma
Native American artists from Oklahoma
artists
Native American
Native American history of Oklahoma